The Aurora Symphony Orchestra is an all-volunteer community-based orchestra founded in 1978, based in Aurora, Colorado.  The Aurora Symphony Orchestra's regular season occurs annually from August through May of each year, during which they perform public concerts including: Fall Masterworks Concert, Holiday Concert, Family Concert, Spring Masterworks Concert and the Arts for a Better Tomorrow Concert.  The orchestra also performs during select summer events.

Musicians 
All musicians of the Aurora Symphony Orchestra are volunteers and are accepted by audition.  Audition are held annual during the month of August and throughout the year, and is open to all musicians who play an orchestral instrument at a proficient through advanced level.  Current membership ranges from high school-age through retirees.  The basic commitment for musicians includes: weekly rehearsals, Dress Rehearsals and scheduled performances.

Organization 
The Aurora Symphony Orchestra operates as a 501(C)3 Non-Profit Organization and is governed by a board of directors consisting of community members and orchestra musician representatives.

Special Events

Young Artist Solo Competition 
The Aurora Symphony Orchestra sponsors a competition for soloists known as the "Young Artist Solo Competition".  This event gives youth performers ranging in age from 12 to 21 years of age the opportunity to showcase their talents as a soloist, accompanied by the Aurora Symphony Orchestra.

Children & Family Concert 
The Aurora Symphony Orchestra annually produces a concert specifically designed for young children, first-time concert goers and their families.  This concert is presented free of charge to all attendees and typically includes programing of music with a multi-cultural theme, including selections with vocal narration, which is often presented in both English and Spanish.  Other activities designed to engage children such as the "Instrument Petting Zoo", where children are encouraged to come on stage with the orchestra members, ask questions and receive first hand experience holding the instruments to make that first positive impression of music.

Collaborations 
The Aurora Symphony Orchestra has been collaborating with other performing arts organizations.

List of Collaborations
 2016 Aurora Dance Arts - The Nutcracker (Ballet) | Pyotr Ilyich Tchaikovsky
 2016 Opera on Tap Colorado - Die Fledermaus (Opera) | Johann Strauss II
 2018 Aurora Dance Arts - The Nutcracker (Ballet) | Pyotr Ilyich Tchaikovsky

References

External links 
 Official Website

Orchestras based in Colorado
Performing arts in Colorado
Culture of Aurora, Colorado
Tourist attractions in Arapahoe County, Colorado
Arts organizations based in Colorado
Musical groups established in 1978
1978 establishments in Colorado